Melarmath is a locality in Agartala, Tripura.

References

Neighbourhoods in Agartala